The Half-Life of Desire is an album by the Either/Orchestra recorded in 1989, with one track from 1988, and released by the Accurate Records label the following year.

Reception 

Allmusic's Brian Olewnick called it "Either/Orchestra's finest, most accomplished release" and said: "Beautifully recorded by legendary engineer Rudy van Gelder, the band is extraordinarily tight and vibrant, showing none of the muddy quality that would sully some of their later work ... Quite a journey, resulting in arguably the best of this unusual band's release. Very highly recommended".

Track listing
 "Strange Meridian" (Russ Gershon) – 8:28
 "Premonitions" (Curtis Hasselbring) – 5:29
 "The Half-Life of Desire" (Gershon) – 5:30
 "He Who Hesitates" (Hasselbring) – 7:54
 "Temptation" (Nacio Herb Brown, Arthur Freed) – 5:17
 "Circle in the Round/I Got It Bad" (Miles Davis/Duke Ellington) – 11:18
 "Red" (Robert Fripp) – 11:21

Personnel
Russ Gershon – tenor saxophone, soprano saxophone, flute, arranger
John Carlson, Tom Halter – trumpet, flugelhorn
Curtis Hasselbring, Russell Jewell – trombone
Douglas Yates – alto saxophone, soprano saxophone
Charlie Kohlhase – alto saxophone, baritone saxophone
John Medeski – piano, organ, DX7
John Dirac – electric guitar, arranger
Mike Rivard – bass
Jerome Deupree – drums
Mark Sandman – vocals, guitar, arranger (track 5)
Robb Rawlings – alto saxophone (track 5)
Dave Finucane – bass clarinet (track 5)
Kenny Freundlich – piano, synthesizer (track 5)

References

Either/Orchestra albums
1990 albums
Albums recorded at Van Gelder Studio